The following is a partial list of the "A" codes for Medical Subject Headings (MeSH), as defined by the United States National Library of Medicine (NLM).

This list continues the information at List of MeSH codes (A14). Codes following these are found at List of MeSH codes (A16). For other MeSH codes, see List of MeSH codes.

The source for this content is the set of 2006 MeSH Trees from the NLM.

– hemic and immune systems

– blood

– blood cells
  – blood platelets
  – erythrocytes
  – erythrocyte membrane
  – erythrocytes, abnormal
  – acanthocytes
  – erythrocyte inclusions
  – heinz bodies
  – megaloblasts
  – spherocytes
  – reticulocytes
  – hemocytes
  – leukocytes
  – granulocytes
  – basophils
  – eosinophils
  – neutrophils
  – leukocytes, mononuclear
  – lymphocytes
  – killer cells
  – killer cells, natural
  – killer cells, lymphokine-activated
  – lymphocyte subsets
  – b-lymphocyte subsets
  – t-lymphocyte subsets
  – b-lymphocytes
  – b-lymphocyte subsets
  – plasma cells
  – t-lymphocytes
  – cd4-positive t-lymphocytes
  – t-lymphocytes, helper-inducer
  – th1 cells
  – th2 cells
  – cd8-positive t-lymphocytes
  – t-lymphocytes, cytotoxic
  – t-lymphocyte subsets
  – lymphocytes, null
  – lymphocytes, tumor-infiltrating
  – monocytes
  – monocytes, activated killer

– fetal blood

– plasma

– serum

– hematopoietic system

– bone marrow cells
  – granulocytes
  – granulocyte precursor cells
  – hematopoietic stem cells
  – myeloid progenitor cells
  – erythroid progenitor cells
  – erythroblasts
  – megaloblasts
  – megakaryocytes
  – reticulocytes
  – granulocyte precursor cells
  – monocytes

– immune system

– antibody-producing cells
  – b-lymphocytes
  – b-lymphocyte subsets
  – plasma cells

– antigen-presenting cells
  – dendritic cells
  – langerhans cells
  – dendritic cells, follicular

– bone marrow

– enterochromaffin cells

– leukocytes
  – granulocytes
  – basophils
  – eosinophils
  – neutrophils
  – leukocytes, mononuclear
  – lymphocytes
  – killer cells
  – killer cells, natural
  – killer cells, lymphokine-activated
  – lymphocyte subsets
  – b-lymphocyte subsets
  – t-lymphocyte subsets
  – b-lymphocytes
  – b-lymphocyte subsets
  – plasma cells
  – t-lymphocytes
  – cd4-positive t-lymphocytes
  – t-lymphocytes, helper-inducer
  – th1 cells
  – th2 cells
  – t-lymphocytes, regulatory
  – cd8-positive t-lymphocytes
  – t-lymphocytes, cytotoxic
  – jurkat cells
  – t-lymphocyte subsets
  – lymphocytes, null
  – lymphocytes, tumor-infiltrating
  – monocytes
  – monocytes, activated killer

– lymphatic system
  – lymphatic vessels
  – endothelium, lymphatic
  – thoracic duct
  – lymphoid tissue
  – adenoids
  – bursa of fabricius
  – germinal center
  – dendritic cells, follicular
  – lymph nodes
  – germinal center
  – dendritic cells, follicular
  – peyer's patches
  – spleen
  – thymus gland
  – tonsil

– mast cells

– phagocytes
  – macrophages
  – epithelioid cells
  – foam cells
  – giant cells, foreign-body
  – giant cells, langhans
  – histiocytes
  – kupffer cells
  – macrophages, alveolar
  – macrophages, peritoneal
  – monocytes
  – monocytes, activated killer
  – neutrophils

– reticuloendothelial system
  – macrophages
  – epithelioid cells
  – foam cells
  – giant cells, foreign-body
  – giant cells, langhans
  – histiocytes
  – kupffer cells
  – macrophages, alveolar
  – macrophages, peritoneal
  – monocytes
  – monocytes, activated killer

The list continues at List of MeSH codes (A16).

A15